IRIS Neyzeh is a  in the Southern Fleet of the Islamic Republic of Iran Navy.

Construction and commissioning 
Neyzeh was built by French Constructions Mécaniques de Normandie at Cherbourg, as one of the second six contracted on  14 October 1974. Her keel was laid down on 12 September 1977 and on 5 July 1978, she was launched. France decided to release the three, and all were commissioned into the fleet on 1 August 1981.

Service history 
On 1 December 2013, Neyzeh was put into service again after an overhaul that took 30 months. Reportedly, she has been equipped with Gader missiles. In 2014,  and Neyzeh were deployed for a joint drill with Pakistan Navy in the Gulf of Oman. Between 2–16 October 2018, she was deployed for an anti-piracy mission to the Arabian Sea and Gulf of Aden, along with her sister  and support ship . On the way back home, they made a port call to Karachi and participated in a two-day joint littoral search and rescue drill with Pakistan Navy. She was among Iranian naval vessels participating in the four-day joint wargame in December 2019, with Russian Navy and the People's Liberation Army Navy of China, named 'Marine Security Belt'.

See also 

 List of current ships of the Islamic Republic of Iran Navy
 List of military equipment manufactured in Iran

References 

Missile boats of the Islamic Republic of Iran Navy
Ships built at Shahid Tamjidi shipyard
Ships of the Islamic Republic of Iran Navy
Ships built in Iran
Missile boats of Iran
1978 ships
Ships built in France
Iran–Iraq War naval ships of Iran